Chad Alec Ripperger (born October 11, 1964) is an American Catholic priest, theologian, philosopher, and exorcist. He is well known in traditional Catholic circles, has presented many conferences throughout the United States on theological and pastoral subjects, and is the founder of the traditional Catholic Society of the Most Sorrowful Mother (the Doloran Fathers) in the Archdiocese of Denver, Colorado, United States.

Biography 

Ripperger was born in Casper, Wyoming. He earned two bachelor's degrees, in theology and philosophy, from the University of San Francisco; and two master's degrees, one in philosophy from the Center for Thomistic Studies of the University of St. Thomas in Houston, Texas, and another in theology from Holy Apostles College and Seminary in Cromwell, Connecticut. He joined the Priestly Fraternity of St. Peter (FSSP), which sent him to Rome to receive his doctorate in philosophy from the Pontifical University of the Holy Cross.

After being ordained a Catholic priest on June 7, 1997, he spent a year in a parish in Omaha, Nebraska, where he worked in the diocesan St. Gregory the Great Seminary in Seward, Nebraska of the Diocese of Lincoln, Nebraska. After working for four years in the Seminary, he was assigned to Our Lady of Guadalupe Seminary in Denton, Nebraska, which is the primary American seminary of the Priestly Fraternity of St. Peter, where he taught dogmatic and moral theology and philosophy for six years. He also served as a pastor in Coeur d'Alene, Idaho for three years.

He served as an exorcist for the Diocese of Tulsa, Oklahoma from 2012 to 2016, and thereafter moved to the Archdiocese of Denver, Colorado. Ripperger left the Priestly Fraternity of Saint Peter so as to found the new priestly community of the Society of the Most Sorrowful Mother (the Doloran Fathers). Archbishop Samuel Aquila of Denver instituted the Society as a public association of the faithful. It is presently housed in Keenesburg, Colorado.

External links

 Society of the Most Sorrowful Mother (the Doloran Fathers)
 Sensus Traditionis, his personal website
 Tumblar House profile

References 

1964 births
Living people
21st-century American non-fiction writers
21st-century American Roman Catholic theologians
American people of German descent
American philosophers
American Roman Catholic priests
Catholic exorcists
Catholics from Wyoming
Catholics from Colorado
Holy Apostles College and Seminary alumni
People from Casper, Wyoming
Pontifical University of the Holy Cross alumni
University of San Francisco alumni
University of St. Thomas (Texas) alumni
Thomists
Priestly Fraternity of St. Peter
American traditionalist Catholics
American exorcists